Pablo Sánchez may refer to:
 Pablo Sánchez (footballer, born 1983), Spanish professional football left winger
 Pablo Sánchez (racing driver) (born 1990), Mexican racing driver
 Pablo Sánchez (footballer, born 1990), Mexican football defensive midfielder
 Pablo Sánchez (footballer, born 1995), English football goalkeeper
 Pablo Sanchez, a fictional character from the Backyard Sports video game series

See also
 Vitamina Sánchez (born 1973), Argentine football midfielder born Pablo Andrés Sánchez Spucches